The Malecón is a 12-block, mile-long esplanade in Puerto Vallarta's Centro and Zona Romántica, in the Mexican state of Jalisco. The waterfront crosses the Cuale River via Puente Río Cuale. Features include Los Arcos, the Malecón Lighthouse, and a collection of sculptures.

Sculptures
The walkway has featured numerous sculptures, including:

 The Boy on the Seahorse by Rafael Zamarripa
 Erizados (2006) by Maritza Vazquez
 The Fish Sellers' Mosaic by Manuel Lepe
 Friendship Fountain by James "Bud" Bottoms and Octavio González
 The Good Fortune Unicorn by Anibal Riebeling
 In Search of Reason by Sergio Bustamante
 Millennium by Mathis Lidice
 Nature as Mother by Adrián Reynoso
 Nostalgia by Ramiz Barquet
 Origin and Destination by Pedro Tello
 Rain by Jovian
 The Rotunda by the Sea by Alejandro Colunga
 Statue of Lorena Ochoa (installed in 2012; since relocated to Marina Vallarta Golf Club, as of 2020)
 Statue of Paschal Baylón by Ramiz Barquet
 The Subtle Stone Eater by Jonás Gutiérrez
 Tritón y Sirena (1990) by Carlos Espino
 Vallarta Dancers by Jim Demetro
 The Washer Woman by Jim Demetro

References

External links

 Visit-Vallarta.com: Malecón boardwalk and sculptures 

Centro, Puerto Vallarta
Puerto Vallarta
Tourist attractions in Jalisco
Waterfronts